"Glory Days" is a single by UK artist Just Jack which was recorded in 2006. It reached 32 in the UK Singles Chart in April 2007.

Most of the music video was filmed down the world-famous Brick Lane in the East End of London.

Track listings
CD single
 "Glory Days"
 "Glory Days" (DJ Mehdi Remix)

External links
 
 

2007 songs
2007 singles
Just Jack songs
Mercury Records singles